Tidal Wave is a 2009 South Korean disaster film directed by Yoon Je-kyoon and starring Sol Kyung-gu, Ha Ji-won, Park Joong-hoon and Uhm Jung-hwa. Billed as South Korea's first disaster film, the film released theatrically on 22 July 2009 and received more than 11 million admissions nationwide.

Plot
Man-sik, a local from the Haeundae District of Busan, unexpectedly loses Yeon-hee's father while based on a deep-sea fishing boat in the Indian Ocean during the 2004 tsunami, due to an error in judgement. Because of this, he could not become involved with Yeon-hee, who runs an unlicensed seafood restaurant, despite her attempts to start a relationship.

Dong-choon and Seung-hyun's grandmother team up with Seung-hyun and get involved in some illegal activity to earn money, but they get caught by the police. Man-sik finally plans to propose to Yeon-hee.

Geologist Kim Hwi runs into his ex-wife, Yoo-jin. Although Yoo-jin has a daughter named Ji-min and a new boyfriend, Hae-chan, they decide not to tell their daughter that Hwi is her birth father as they are worried about how she might react.

A wealthy college student from Seoul, Hee-mi, accidentally falls into the sea from a yacht. Hyeong-sik, Man-sik's younger brother, is a lifeguard who rescues Hee-mi. Hee-mi becomes angered by the 'violent' rescue and annoys him by following him around, and the two begin to fall in love.

During the fireworks, Man-sik proposes to Yeon-hee. Yeon-hee says that a ribbon hung outside her restaurant the day after would mean 'yes'. On the day after, Man-sik sees no ribbon, and he meets Dong-choon, who was nearby. Dong-choon tells Man-sik that he told Yeon-hee why her father died several years ago. Man-sik becomes furious, for he thinks that what Dong-choon told Yeon-hee caused there to be no ribbon; and attempts to attack him. During the fight, they witness a flock of birds flying away.

Hwi notices that the Sea of Japan (known as the East Sea in Korea) is displaying similar activity to what was observed in the Indian Ocean five years prior. Despite his warnings, the Disaster Prevention Agency assures him that South Korea is at no risk, but a large megatsunami forms because of a landslide near Japan and starts to travel towards Busan, where millions of beachgoers are vacationing. Hwi realizes that the citizens of Busan have only 10 minutes to escape. A short earthquake (a minor aftershock) hits Busan, before the sea starts receding from the shore, causing mass hysteria as people realize a tsunami is coming. Thousands of people run for their lives before the tsunami reaches Haeundae and continues into Busan. Dong-choon, Seung-hyun, his grandmother, and other people on the Gwangan Bridge are swept away by the sea. A telephone pole collapses, electrocuting everyone in the water, but Man-sik and Yeon-hee survive. Dong-choon awakens on the bridge, but when he tries and fails to light a cigarette and subsequently discards the lighter out of frustration, it falls into petrol leaking from a tanker, causing an explosion that severs the bridge in half, sending shipping containers flying into buildings on the shore.

Hyeong-sik jumps down from a rescue helicopter and saves Hee-mi in the sea. When Hyeong-sik and Joon-ha are together on the rope, Hyeong-sik realizes the rope is about to break, and only one can go up to the helicopter. He cuts the connected rope and falls into the violent sea. The elevator Yoo-jin is trapped in floods with water, and she talks in tears to her daughter Ji-min on her phone. A worker saves Yoo-jin. On the roof, she meets Ji-min and Hwi. The two help their daughter get on a crowded rescue helicopter. Before the helicopter leaves, Hwi tells his daughter that he is really her father. Yoo-jin and Hwi hug each other before another megatsunami kills them.

After the tsunami, there is a memorial service for the thousands of people who died, including Hyeong-sik and Man-sik's uncle. Dong-choon finds out that his mother died as well and breaks into tears. Many people help reconstruct Busan. Man-sik, while cleaning the ruins of Yeon-hee's restaurant, finds the red ribbon which Yeon-hee said was a 'yes' to his proposal. The movie ends with a scene of Haeundae in ruins but in a hopeful atmosphere.

Cast 

 Sol Kyung-gu as Man-sik
 Ha Ji-won as Yeon-hee
 Park Joong-hoon as Kim-hwi
 Uhm Jung-hwa as Yoo-jin
 Yeo Ho-min as Joon-ha
 Kim Yoo-bin as Jin-soo
 Kim Jeong-woon as Hyeong-cheol
 Lee Min-ki as Hyung-sik
 Kang Ye-won as Hi-mi
 Son Chae-bin as Eun-so
 Lee Si-on as Gong-joo
 Song jae-ho as Eok-jo
 Byeong-Suk Seong as Dong-choon's mother
 Kim In-kwon as Dong-choon
 Kim Yoo-jung as Ji-min
 Chun Bo-geun as Seung-hyun
 Seong Yoo-kyeong as You-kyung
 Kim In-gyoo as You-kyung's dad
 Hwang In-joon as You-kyung's dad
 Tae In-ho
Song Jae-ho
Kim Ji-yeong as Geum-ryeon

Release 
Distribution rights for Haeundae was sold to Hong Kong, Taiwan, India, Indonesia, Japan, Malaysia, Philippines, Singapore, Thailand, Vietnam, the Czech Republic, Slovakia, Russia, Germany, Hungary, France, Quebec, Brazil, the United Kingdom, Australia and Turkey. The film was released in South Korea on 22 July 2009. As of 20 September 2009, Haeundae had received a total of 11,301,649 admissions in South Korean theatres.

In English-speaking countries, the film was released as Tidal Wave (an incorrect term as such types of waves are actually caused by gravitational influences, not displacement of water). In the United Kingdom, the DVD was released on October 12, 2009 from Entertainment One.

Awards and nominations

References

External links 
  
 
 
 
 
 

2009 films
2000s disaster films
2009 drama films
South Korean science fiction films
South Korean disaster films
Films set in Busan
Films about tsunamis
2000s Korean-language films
2000s survival films
Flood films
CJ Entertainment films
Films directed by Yoon Je-kyoon
2000s South Korean films